Nipponacmea concinna is a species of sea snail, a true limpet, a marine gastropod mollusk in the family Lottiidae, one of the families of true limpets.

Description

Distribution
This marine species occurs off Japan

References

 Jiang JX. & Zhou QL. (1982). A preliminary survey of the rocky intertidal communities along Tolo Harbour, Hong Kong. In: Morton B, editor. Proceedings of the first international marine biological workshop: The marine flora and fauna of Hong Kong and southern China . Hong Kong University Press, Hong Kong.2: pp 673-686.
 Takada, Y. (1997). Recruitment, Growth and Survival of Nipponacmea Limpets on a Boulder Shore in Amakusa. Venus (Journal of the Malacological Society of Japan). 56 (2): 145-155.
 Nakano T. & Ozawa T. (2007). Worldwide phylogeography of limpets of the order Patellogastropoda: molecular, morphological and paleontological evidence. Journal of Molluscan Studies 73(1): 79–99.
 Takada, Y. (2001). Comparison of the Activity Patterns of Nine Molluscan Grazers on a Boulder Shore at Amakusa, Japan. Venus (Journal of the Malacological Society of Japan). 60 (3): 157-172

External links
 Lischke, C. E. (1870). Diagnosen neuer Meeres-Conchylien von Japan. Malakozoologische Blätter. 17: 23-29

Lottiidae
Gastropods described in 1870